Into Eternity may refer to:
 Into Eternity (band), a progressive metal band from Regina, Saskatchewan, Canada
 Into Eternity (album), the eponymous debut studio album by the above band
 Into Eternity (film), a 2009 feature documentary film directed by Michael Madsen